Aleksander Aleksandrovich Mokshantsev (Мокшанцев Александр Александрович; born February 17, 1995) is a Russian ice hockey player for Polska Hokej Liga side STS Sanok. He most recently iced for Yuzhny Ural Orsk. He was previously with Nottingham Panthers of the Elite Ice Hockey League (EIHL) and Ligue Magnus side Rapaces de Gap.

Mokshantsev made his Kontinental Hockey League (KHL) debut playing with Lokomotiv Yaroslavl during the 2013–14 KHL season.

In June 2017, Mokshantsev moved to the UK to sign for the Nottingham Panthers of the Elite League. He has since iced with Rapaces de Gap, Dizel Penza, HC Shakhtyor Soligorsk and Yuzhny Ural Orsk.

References

External links

1995 births
Living people
Lokomotiv Yaroslavl players
Russian ice hockey forwards
Nottingham Panthers players
Rapaces de Gap players
Dizel Penza players
KH Sanok players
HC Shakhtyor Soligorsk players
Yermak Angarsk players
Yuzhny Ural Orsk players